The Athletics at the 2016 Summer Paralympics – Women's 400 metres T54 event at the 2016 Paralympic Games took place on 11 September 2016, at the Estádio Olímpico João Havelange.

Heats

Heat 1 
10:00 11 September 2016:

Heat 2 
10:06 11 September 2016:

Final 
17:37 11 September 2016:

Notes

Athletics at the 2016 Summer Paralympics